The Heinkel He 119 was an experimental single-propeller monoplane with two coupled engines, developed in Germany. A private venture by Heinkel to test radical ideas by the Günter brothers, the He 119 was originally intended to act as an unarmed reconnaissance bomber capable of eluding all fighters due to its high performance.

Development 
Design was begun in the late summer of 1936. A notable feature of the aircraft was the streamlined fuselage, most likely as an evolutionary descendant of the 1932-vintage Heinkel He 70 record-setting single-engined mailplane design, but without the He 70's protruding canopy-enclosed crew accommodation existing anywhere along the exterior. Instead, the He 119's forward fuselage featured an extensively glazed cockpit forming the nose itself, heavily framed with many diagonally braced windows immediately behind the propeller spinner's rear edge. Two of the three-man crew sat one each side of the driveshaft, which ran aft to a "power system", a coupled  pair of Daimler-Benz DB 601 engines mounted above the wing center-section within the fuselage, mounted together within a common mount (the starboard component engine having a "mirror-image" centrifugal supercharger) with a common gear reduction unit fitted to the front ends of each component engine, forming a drive unit known as the DB 606, the first German aircraft to use the "high-power" powerplant system. meant to provide German aircraft with an aviation powerplant design of over-1,500 kW (2,000 PS) output capability, but weighing 1.5 tonnes apiece.

The DB 606 was installed just behind the aft cockpit wall, near the center of gravity, with an enclosed extension shaft passing through the centerline of the extensively glazed cockpit to drive a large four-blade variable-pitch airscrew in the nose. An evaporative cooling system was used on the V1, with the remaining prototypes receiving a semi-retractable radiator directly below the engine to augment cooling during take-off and climb.

Only eight prototypes were completed and the aircraft did not see production, mainly because of the shortages of DB 601 "component" engines to construct the  DB 606 "power systems" they formed. The first two prototypes were built as land planes, with retractable landing gear. The third prototype (V3) was constructed as a seaplane with twin floats. This was tested at the Erprobungsstelle Travemünde military seaplane test facility on the Baltic coast, and was scrapped in 1942 at Heinkel's factory airfield in the estuarine Rostock-Schmarl community, then known as Marienehe.

On 22 November 1937, the fourth prototype (V4) made a world class-record flight in which it recorded an airspeed of 505 km/h (314 mph), with a payload of 1,000 kg (2,205 lb), over a distance of 1,000 km (621 mi). The four remaining prototypes were completed during the spring and early summer of 1938, the V5 and V6 being A-series production prototypes for the reconnaissance model, and the V7 and V8 being B-series production prototypes for the bomber model.

These four aircraft were three-seaters with a defensive armament of one  MG 15 machine gun in a dorsal position, V7 and V8 having provision for a normal bombload of three 250 kg (551 lb) bombs or maximum bombload of 1,000 kg (2,205 lb). V7 and V8 were sold to Japan in May 1940, and extensively studied; the insights thus gained were used in the design of the Yokosuka R2Y. The remaining prototypes served as engine test-beds, flying with various prototype versions of the DB 606 and DB 610 (twinned DB 605s) and the strictly-experimental DB 613 (twinned DB 603).

Variants
He 111U
 Propaganda designation of the He 119
He 119
 Basic version, eight prototypes built.  
He 519 1944 high-speed bomber development, designed as a private venture by Heinkel to test radical ideas by the Günter brothers, the He 519 was designed to use the 24-cylinder Daimler-Benz DB 613, but the aircraft remained a concept and was abandoned at the end of the war.

Specifications (He 119 V6)

See also

References

Sources

 Donald, David, "An Industry of Prototypes - Heinkel He 119", Wings of Fame, Volume 12. Aerospace Publishing Ltd., London, UK/AIRtime Publishing Inc., Westport, Connecticut, 1998,  / 1-880588-23-4, pp. 30–34.
 Green, William. Warplanes of the Third Reich. New York: Doubleday, 1972. .

He 119
1930s German experimental aircraft
1930s German military reconnaissance aircraft
Abandoned military aircraft projects of Germany
Mid-engined aircraft
Inverted gull-wing aircraft
Low-wing aircraft
Single-engined tractor aircraft
Aircraft first flown in 1937